North Atlantic is a Lebanese restaurant base on Casual German Diners. Their slogan is "Dive Into New Experience".

Meals served
The often meals served are usually fish fillet that are cooked in many different ways. Also, there are some different meals like German Hotdog, grilled chicken or beef, burgers... Moreover, they have a large varieties of smoothies and hot drinks. The recommended meals are: Boldolerias, German Hotdog, Thai Soup, North Atlantic Sandwich, Charcoal Beef Burger...

Branches and projects
North Atlantic has till now 1 branch located in Beirut, Lebanon, there is a branch that will open in Abu Dhabi after 4 or 5 months. Also, they have future projects to open branches in Qatar, Saudi Arabia, Kuwait, and Oman.

Restaurant chains
Restaurants in Lebanon